Antonijs Springovičs (1 November 1876 – 1 October 1958) was a Roman Catholic Latvian prelate who became the first Archbishop of Riga in 1923.

Early years
Antonijs Springovičs was born on 31 October 1876 in Rēzekne, Latvia. In 1897 he joined the seminary in Saint Petersburg. He received a Master's degree in Theology. He was ordained priest by Bolesław Hieronim Kłopotowski, the Archbishop of Mohilev on 24 June 1901.

Bishop of Riga
On 29 September 1918, the Diocese of Riga was restored and Eduard O'Rourke was appointed as the first bishop. O'Rourke's position in Riga was problematic as German forces occupied the city in early 1919. By the end of World War I, the ecclesiastical organisation was largely destroyed, and only a few priests were active. O'Rourke did not speak Latvian but tried to encourage Latvian priests. He resigned after a new government in Latvia was appointed and there was a popular movement calling for an ethnic Latvian bishop. Thus on 14 April 1920 Pope Benedict XV appointed Springovičs as O'Rourke's successor with the bull Hodies nos. He was consecrated bishop on 22 August 1920 by Juozapas Skvireckas.

Metropolitan Archbishop
On 25 November 1923 Springovičs was appointed as the first archbishop of Riga after the diocese was elevated on 25 October 1923. In November 1926 he was awarded the Latvian Order of the Three Stars. On 8 May 1937 Springovičs became metropolitan archbishop after the suffragan Diocese of Liepāja was created. In 1939 he was awarded an honorary doctorate from the University of Latvia.

Soviet occupation
Archbishop Springovičs faced numerous challenges during the Soviet occupation. The Faculty of Theology in the University of Latvia was closed and its library books were confiscated. Springovičs remained in Latvia under the pretext of poor health after he was ordered to leave. On 7 March 1946 the Major Seminary of Riga was reopened after it was closed by the Soviets. Archbishop Springovičs died on October 1, 1958. His funeral took place on October 6 in St. James's Cathedral, Riga. The requiem mass was celebrated by Bishop Pēteris Strods. Springovičs was buried in St Michael's cemetery in Riga.

Ecclesiastical appointments
 1901 - 1905: School chaplain
 1905 - 1917: Dean of Līksna
 1917 - 1918: General Vicar of Mohilev
 1918 - 1920: General Vicar of Riga
 1920 - 1923: Bishop of Riga
 1923 - 1937: Archbishop of Riga
 1937 - 1958: Metropolitan Archbishop of Riga

References

20th-century Roman Catholic bishops in Latvia
1876 births
1958 deaths
Archbishops of Riga